Trà Bồng is a district (huyện) of Quảng Ngãi province in the South Central Coast region of Vietnam. As of 2019 the district had a population of 53,379. The district covers an area of 760.34 km². The district capital lies at Trà Xuân.

References

Districts of Quảng Ngãi province